Whyghtone Kamthunzi (31 July 1956 - 18 May 2000) was a leading writer in the Chichewa language of Malawi in the 1980s and 1990s.

Kamthunzi was born in the village of Njolomole in Ntcheu district in Malawi. His father was a school teacher. After attending Ntcheu Secondary School from 1972 to 1976 he trained as a teacher at Lilongwe Teachers’ College. He began his teaching career in 1978 at Nkhata Bay and later moved to Malili Primary School in Likuni near Lilongwe.

Kamthunzi began writing plays and stories in 1976. He was also the leader of a drama group in Lilongwe. Kamthunzi became well known for his radio series Tinkanena ('We Told You So'), a series of plays on the theme of Aids about a young man called Same.

Among the short novels written by Kamthunzi were the following:
Wachitatu Nkapasule ('The Third Person is a Family-Breaker') (Popular Publications 1987)
A girl from a wealthy family falls in love with a poor boy and marries him. But the boy’s uncle is dead against the marriage and does his best to break it up. In the end, however, the good sense and diplomacy of the girl’s parents win the day.
Sungani: Mwana Wolimba Mtima ('Sungani, the Courageous Boy') (Popular Publications 1988)
A young boy, Sungani, brought up in a village, learns to be sympathetic to animals. He is distressed when the local chief starts a hunt to kill baboons who are stealing the village crops and tries unsuccessfully to persuade the chief to stop the hunt. In the end, however, an environmental disaster follows and Sungani is praised for his foresight.
Agnesi ndi Mphunzitsi Wake ('Agnes and her Teacher') (Popular Publications 1990)
Sautso, the young unmarried headmaster of a secondary school, forms a relationship with one of his students, a distant cousin, despite opposition from the local chief, from his own parents, and from Khumbo, an unqualified teacher whom he has been forced to dismiss. When the girl is raped and dies from a home abortion he is falsely accused of murder, but is saved at the last minute when the rapist confesses.
Nyanga ya Nsatsi ('A Horn made from a Castor Oil Plant') (Popular Publications 1990)
Gadula Wosamva ('Gadula, Who Wouldn't Listen') (Dzuka Pub. Co. 1991)
Njokaluzi ('The Harmless Snake') (Popular Publications 1993)
A plucky boy called Chifundo is excited to be selected for a secondary boarding school. But when he gets there, like other first year boys he is terrorised by one of the senior boys called Pasula. One day, however, he gets into a fight with Pasula and vanquishes him, to the delight of everyone.
Tiferenji ('Why should we die?') (Popular Publications 1996)
Kuno n'Kunja ('This is the World') (Popular Publications 1996)
Wakufa Sadziwika ('The One who Dies Isn’t Known') (CLAIM Malawi 2005)
A young newly appointed doctor, Chikondi, befriends a madman and tries to cure him. But the local chief and the hospital director are afraid that the madman will reveal their secrets and they plot to have Chikondi murdered. By good fortune the plot goes wrong and the criminals are punished.

Notes

References

1956 births
2000 deaths
Malawian novelists
Chewa-language writers